The Dudley Jones House is a historic house in Terry, Mississippi. It was built in 1907 for the Jones family, who remained the property owners until 1926. They sold it to W. D. Terry, Terry's founder, who died in 1958. His son George sold the house in 1970.

The house was designed in the Queen Anne architectural style. It has been listed on the National Register of Historic Places since August 2, 1984.

References

Houses on the National Register of Historic Places in Mississippi
National Register of Historic Places in Hinds County, Mississippi
Queen Anne architecture in Mississippi
Houses completed in 1907